Minuscule 884 (in the Gregory-Aland numbering), A126 (von Soden), is an 11th-century Greek minuscule manuscript of the New Testament on parchment. The manuscript has not survived in complete condition.

Description 

The codex contains the text of the Gospel of Luke and Gospel of John, with a commentary, on 256 parchment leaves (size ), with lacuna in Luke 1:1-3:1. The text is written in one column per page, 30 lines per page.
The commentary is of Theophylact of Ohrid.
It was altered by a later hand (biblical text and a commentary).

Text 
The Greek text of the codex is a representative of the Byzantine text-type. Hermann von Soden classified it to the textual family Iβ. It means, it has some textual affinities to 1216 and minuscule 16. Kurt Aland placed it in Category V.

According to the Claremont Profile Method it represents the textual family Kx in Luke 10. In Luke 20 it belongs to the textual family of Lake's group, as a weak member. In Luke 1 no profile was made, because the manuscript is defective.

History 

According to F. H. A. Scrivener it was written in the 13th century, according to C. R. Gregory in the 11th century. Currently the manuscript is dated by the INTF to the 11th century.

The manuscript was added to the list of New Testament manuscripts by Scrivener (696e), Gregory (884e). Gregory saw it in 1886.

It was described by Henry Stevenson.

Currently the manuscript is housed at the Vatican Library (Reg. gr. 3), in Rome.

See also 

 List of New Testament minuscules (1–1000)
 Biblical manuscript
 Textual criticism
 Minuscule 883

References

Further reading 

 
 Henry Stevenson, Codices manuscripti Graeci Reginae Svecorum et Pii Pp. II. Bibliothecae Vaticanae, descripti praeside I.B. Cardinali Pitra, Rom 1888.

External links 
 
 Digitised manuscript at the INTF

Greek New Testament minuscules
11th-century biblical manuscripts
Manuscripts of the Vatican Library